Nicholas Salos of Pskov was a Russian self-styled prophet ("Fool-for-Christ") in opposition of Tsar Ivan IV's oprichnina. In 1570, Ivan IV retaliated by raiding Pskov. However, during the raid Nicholas reprimanded the tsar, causing him to retreat his force to Alexandrov. He is regarded as a saint in the Eastern Orthodox Church.

References
  Nicholas Salos of Pskov
George Vernadsky. A History of Russia. (Yale University Press, 1969).

Russian religious leaders
Russian saints of the Eastern Orthodox Church
People from Pskov
16th-century Russian people